Deborah Digges (February 6, 1950 – April 10, 2009) was an American poet and teacher.

Biography
She was born Deborah Leah Sugarbaker in Jefferson City, Missouri, on February 6, 1950.  Her father was a physician and her mother was a nurse; she was the sixth child in a family of ten children.

Digges received a Bachelor of Arts degree from the University of California, Riverside in 1976, a Master's from the University of Missouri in 1982, and her Master of Fine Arts in Poetry from the Iowa Writers Workshop in 1984.  In the course of her academic career, she taught in the writing and English faculties of New York University, Boston University, Columbia University, and Tufts University.

She authored four books of poetry and two memoirs.  Her first book of poems, Vesper Sparrows, won the Delmore Schwartz Memorial Prize for Poetry.  In 1997 Digges was awarded the Kingsley Tufts Poetry Award, the largest prize for a single work of poetry, for her book Rough Music.   She was also the winner of two Pushcart Prizes.  Digges translated the poems of the Cuban poet María Elena Cruz Varela.  A book of poetry, The Wind Blows Through the Doors of My Heart: Poems, was published by Knopf in 2010.
  
Digges died April 10, 2009, in Amherst, Massachusetts. Her death was reported as a suicide following her fatal fall from the top of the bleachers of Warren McGuirk Alumni Stadium at the University of Massachusetts Amherst. She is buried with her third husband, Franklin M. Loew, at Wildwood Cemetery in Amherst.

Bibliography
Poetry
 Vesper Sparrows (Atheneum Publishers, 1986)
 Late In The Millennium (Knopf, 1989)
 Rough Music (Random House, 1997)
 Trapeze (Knopf, 2005)
 The Wind Blows Through the Doors of My Heart: Poems (Knopf, 2010, posthumous)

Memoirs
 Fugitive Spring (Knopf, 1992)
 The Stardust Lounge: Stories from a Boy's Adolescence (Anchor Books, 2001).

Translation
 Ballad of the Blood/Balada De La Sangre: The Poems of Maria Elena Cruz (Ecco Press, 1997)

Honors and grants
Delmore Schwartz Memorial Prize
Kingsley Tufts Poetry Award
Ingram Merrill Foundation grant
National Endowment for the Arts grant
John Simon Guggenheim Foundation grant

Notes

References

External links

 Academy of American Poets: Deborah Digges
 Faculty Bio at Tufts University
 Two poems from Rough Music
 Video of Deborah Digges' reading on 3/9/09 at the Boston Court Theatre in Pasadena CA, as featured on Poetry.LA
 Deborah Digges, Poet Who Channeled Struggles, Dies at 59, The New York Times, April 16, 2009
 Tufts mourns acclaimed poet, professor, Boston Globe, April 14, 2009
 Deborah Digges dies at 59; distinguished poet and memoirist, LA Times, April 27, 2009
 Correspondence with Gerald Stern

1950 births
2009 suicides
American women poets
Iowa Writers' Workshop alumni
University of Missouri alumni
University of California, Riverside alumni
Suicides by jumping in the United States
20th-century American poets
20th-century American women writers
21st-century American women